Neo Moroka is Chairman of De Beers Botswana. He formerly was a politician in Botswana, serving as Minister of Trade and Industry from 2004 to 2009.

Moroka earned degrees in ecology and was an agricultural advisor to Barclays Bank from 1984 to 1991. He subsequently worked as managing director at BP Botswana. He was elected to the National Assembly for the first time in the October 2004 general election from Kgalagadi South constituency and represents the governing Botswana Democratic Party. Following the election, he was appointed as Minister of Trade and Industry on November 9, 2004.

References

External links
 Profile of Neo Moroka on Government web-site

Year of birth missing (living people)
People from Tsabong
Living people
Members of the National Assembly (Botswana)
Government ministers of Botswana
Botswana Democratic Party politicians